Benoît Vaugrenard (born 5 January 1982) is a French former road racing cyclist, who competed professionally for  and its successors between 2003 and 2019. He competed in 11 Grand Tours: six times in the Tour de France, three times in the Giro d'Italia(2004, 2016, and 2017) and twice in the Vuelta a España (2005 and 2012).

Major results

2003
 6th Tour du Finistère
2005
 2nd Paris–Bourges
 5th Tour du Finistère
 7th Tour de Vendée
2006
 6th Overall Circuit de la Sarthe
1st  Young rider classification
2007
 1st  Time trial, National Road Championships
 1st Polynormande
 3rd Paris–Camembert
 5th Tour du Finistère
 7th Overall Circuit de la Sarthe
2008
 1st  Overall Tour du Poitou-Charentes
1st Stage 3
 1st Stage 4 Tour du Limousin
 2nd Route Adélie
 3rd Paris–Camembert
 4th Overall Circuit de la Sarthe
 6th Grand Prix de Wallonie
 8th Overall Critérium International
2009
 1st Grand Prix d'Isbergues
 3rd Overall Circuit de la Sarthe
 6th Route Adélie
 8th Liège–Bastogne–Liège
 10th Brabantse Pijl
 10th Paris–Camembert
2010
 1st Stage 1 Volta ao Algarve
 1st Stage 5 Four Days of Dunkirk
 3rd Route Adélie
 5th Tour de la Somme
 6th Polynormande
2012
 5th Tour de Vendée
2014
 4th Boucles de l'Aulne
2018
 2nd Route Adélie

Grand Tour general classification results timeline

References

External links

Palmares on Cycling Base (French)

1982 births
Living people
French male cyclists
Sportspeople from Vannes
Cyclists from Brittany